The Scandinavian Journal of the Old Testament is a biannual peer-reviewed academic journal covering aspects of the Hebrew Bible. It was established by Niels Peter Lemche (University of Copenhagen) and Knud Jeppesen. As per 2020, Lemche is editor-in-chief.

References

External links 
 

Biblical studies journals
Publications established in 1985
Taylor & Francis academic journals
Biannual journals
English-language journals
1985 establishments in Denmark